The Independence Day of Kyrgyzstan is the main state holiday in Kyrgyzstan. It is celebrated in Kyrgyzstan annually on August 31, the anniversary of its declaration of independence in 1991.

History 
On August 31, 1991, the Supreme Council of the Republic of Kyrgyzstan adopted a law on the "Declaration on State Independence of the Republic of Kyrgyzstan".  Because of this, the Kyrgyz Republic was declared an independent state. Kyrgyzstan officially adhered to the principles of international law, and cooperation between peoples. In 1993, the first constitution was adopted, which has changed several times in 20 years. In the years since independence, Kyrgyzstan has had two revolutions, each putting the first two Presidents of Kyrgyzstan in exile in Russia and Belarus respectively.

Annual mass event
Annually, a mass cultural event is held on Ala-Too Square, which is attended by thousands of spectators as well as high ranking politicians. It is held in the presence of the President of Kyrgyzstan, Prime Minister, Speaker of the Supreme Council, and Mayor of Bishkek as well as other politicians from the Supreme Council and former presidents and prime ministers. Normally, a theatrical prologue of historical figures who contributed to the establishment of Kyrgyz statehood is shown. The president usually delivers a speech to those present after the entrance of the National colours (the Flag of Kyrgyzstan) and the performance of the Mamlekettik Gimni (National Anthem) by a choir and symphonic orchestra. Kyrgyz pop stars as well as traditional dance ensembles perform during this event.

Bishkek military parade 
A military parade on August 31 is held every 5 years in Bishkek on Ala-Too Square in honor of  Independence Day. Smaller military parades are also held in other cities in Kyrgyzstan (such as Osh, and Jalal-Abad).

The parade commander gives the order to commence the parade of the Bishkek Garrison at 10:00 am. The Minister of Defense (or on some occasions the Chief of the General Staff) arrives on the square and is greeted by the parade commander (usually the Bishkek Garrison commander), who informs the minister that the parade is now ready for inspection. The minister then inspects the troops on the square in the following manner:

Minister: Hello Comrades of the (states formation's name)Formation: Greetings Comrade Minister of Defence!Minister: Congratulations on the occasion of the anniversary of the independence of the Kyrgyz Republic!

After he inspects the troops and disembarks from the vehicle and reports to the President of Kyrgyzstan in their position as Commander in Chief on the status of the parade. After this is done, the president delivers an address on the holiday. After the speech, the Mamlekettik Gimni (National Anthem) is performed by the Band of the General Staff of the Armed Forces of Kyrgyzstan. After the performance of the national anthem, the commander of the parade gives the command to begin the parade. The parade formations and military equipment of the Armed Forces of the Republic of Kyrgyzstan then  march on the square, saluting to their Commander in Chief as they march past the central tribune.

List of parades

Other events

Other events are sometimes timed to coincide with the celebration of Independence Day. In 2019, an equestrian games in the Issyk-Kul Region took place on the days leading up to Independence Day. Sporting events such as soccer games, swimming competitions and traditional mass games are also held. In 2012, President Almazbek Atambayev attended the opening ceremony of a larger flagpole with the State Flag on Boz-Boltok Mountain in Alamüdün, a town and northern suburb of Bishkek in the Chuy Region. The year before, a statue of Manas was installed on Ala-Too Square.

The 29th anniversary celebrations in 2020 were celebrated online due to the COVID-19 pandemic. Earlier that May, MP Zhanar Akayev proposed the idea to celebrate the 30th anniversary of Kyrgyzstan's independence in Batken at a meeting of the Jogorku Kenesh, citing it as a reason for the development of domestic tourism. The Commonwealth of Independent States Youth Symphony Orchestra performed at the concert event in 2021.

Controversies
In 2016, on the eve of Independence Day, the Chinese Embassy in Bishkek was bombed by a lone suicide bomber driving his car through the gates of the embassy. The driver of the car was killed while three embassy employees were injured. The bomber was believed to be part of the Uyghur erhnic group who primarily live in the Chinese province of Xinjiang.
During a speech by her President Atambayev at on Independence Day in 2016, his predecessor Roza Otunbayeva walked off the stage after Atambayev repeatedly criticized her government, saying: "If you have already forgotten Roza Isakovna [Otunbayeva], then we well remember, what chaos there was after the adoption of the new constitution.

See also 
 Constitution of Kyrgyzstan
 List of independence days
 Public holidays in Kyrgyzstan
 Kyrgyz Republic commemorative currency

References

Videos 
Бишкек, 31-август. 2011 ж. Ала-Тоо
Таберик: 20-летие независимости Кыргызстана, парад на площади 2011
Военный парад в Бишкеке (2011) - Military parade in Bishkek (2011)
Праздничный парад к 25-летию независимости КР
Посол США делает юрту
Таберик: "Самба" 2000 год, день независимости Кыргызстана
Празднование 10 летия независимости КР
Празднование 25-летия независимости Кыргызстана
Жээнбеков в День независимости призвал вместе построить процветающий Кыргызстан

August observances
Kyrgyzstan
1991 establishments in Kyrgyzstan
Events in Kyrgyzstan
Public holidays in Kyrgyzstan